Thai Meethu Sathiyam is a 1978 Indian Tamil-language Curry Western film directed by R. Thyagarajan and produced by Sandow M. M. A. Chinnappa Thevar. The film stars Rajinikanth and Sripriya, with Mohan Babu, Prabhakar, Suruli Rajan, Sundararajan, A. V. M. Rajan, S. A. Ashokan, Nagesh, Ambareesh, Jayamalini and Sukumari in supporting roles. It focuses on a shepherd who vows to avenge his parents by killing the murderers.

The film was originally planned by Thevar in the late 1960s under the title Marupiravi with M. G. Ramachandran intended to star; however, as Ramachandran was unwell at that time, as well as involved in a legal case, the film was shelved. Thevar later revived the project as Thai Meethu Sathiyam, with Rajinikanth cast in the lead role as Ramachandran had retired from acting by then. It was the last film produced by Thevar to be released; he died when the film was still in production.

Thai Meethu Sathiyam was released on 30 October 1978, a month after Thevar's death, and became a commercial success, running for over 100 days in theatres.

Plot 

Babu is a shepherd with a dog named Ramu. When criminals Balu and Johnny murder his parents, he swears upon his mother that he will have revenge. Babu trains under the local zamindar, and is revealed to be naturally skilled at marksmanship. After dressing himself like a cowboy, equipping himself with the zamindar's guns and a horse, and with Ramu as his aide, he fulfils his promise by killing the criminals.

Cast 
 Rajinikanth as Babu
 Sripriya as Sivakami
 Mohan Babu as Johnny
 Prabhakar as Balu
 Suruli Rajan as Somanathan
 Sundararajan as Johnny's father
 A. V. M. Rajan as Kandhaswamy
 S. A. Ashokan
 Nagesh
 Ambareesh as the zamindar
 Jayamalini
 Sukumari as Babu's mother

Production 
In the late 1960s, Sandow M. M. A. Chinnappa Thevar had planned to produce a film starring M. G. Ramachandran, titled Marupiravi; however, Ramachandran was unwell at that time, as well as involved in a legal case, resulting in the film being shelved. Thevar later revived the film in the late 1970s with a new title, Thai Meethu Sathiyam, but as Ramachandran had retired from acting after becoming the chief minister of Tamil Nadu, Rajinikanth was instead cast. The film, directed by R. Thyagarajan, was Rajinikanth's first film in the Western genre, and the plot took inspiration from several Curry Westerns starring Jaishankar. It was the last film produced by Thevar to be released; he died on 8 September when the film was still in production.

Themes 
Thai Meethu Sathiyam deals with one of the most recurrent themes in Tamil cinema: revenge. Like most Thyagarajan films, this has an animal playing a prominent character. The Economic Times likened the relationship between Babu and his dog Ramu to that of Wallace and Gromit.

Soundtrack 
The soundtrack was composed by the duo Shankar–Ganesh.

Release and reception 
Thai Meethu Sathiyam was released on 30 October 1978, Diwali day. Despite facing competition from many other Diwali releases, the film became a commercial success, running for over 100 days in theatres, and Rajinikanth "carved out for himself a niche in vendetta roles".

References

Bibliography

External links 
 

1970s Tamil-language films
1970s Western (genre) films
1978 films
Films directed by R. Thyagarajan (director)
Films scored by Shankar–Ganesh
Indian films about revenge
Indian Western (genre) films